Culver is a city in Jefferson County, Oregon, United States. The population was 1,357 at the 2010 census.

History 

Orace Gabriel Collver moved from Coos Bay, Oregon, to Central Oregon and founded the town of Culver. Since he was the postmaster, he got to name the town, but to avoid confusion with another town with similar spelling and sound, he changed it to Culver. He built a general store, which housed the post office and became the center of the community. In 1911, the railroad came through, but on the opposite side of the valley, so the town relocated to the railroad. Collver had the whole house moved to the new location, while the townspeople used the lumber from their old homes and buildings to build new ones. The upstairs of his store housed a meeting hall that was used for local events and dances.

Collver married Margaret J. Barnett on October 16, 1881. They raised Ruth Church, the daughter of his sister, Sarah Collver Church, after Sarah's death.

Geography 

Demographics

2010 census
As of the census of 2010, there were 1,357 people, 436 households, and 338 families living in the city. The racial makeup of the city was 79.5% White, 0.4% African American, 3.3% Native American, 0.4% Asian, 0.1% Pacific Islander, 13.0% from other races, and 3.4% from two or more races. Hispanic or Latino of any race were 30.4% of the population.

There were 436 households, of which 53.4% had children under the age of 18 living with them, 56.2% were married couples living together, 13.3% had a female householder with no husband present, 8.0% had a male householder with no wife present, and 22.5% were non-families. 18.3% of all households were made up of individuals, and 7.3% had someone living alone who was 65 years of age or older. The average household size was 3.10 and the average family size was 3.51.

The median age in the city was 30.3 years. 36.2% of residents were under the age of 18; 6.9% were between the ages of 18 and 24; 27.1% were from 25 to 44; 21.3% were from 45 to 64; and 8.4% were 65 years of age or older. The gender makeup of the city was 51.7% male and 48.3% female.

2000 census
As of the census of 2000, there were 802 people, 254 households, and 198 families living in the city. The population density was 1,302.0 people per square mile (499.4/km2). There were 275 housing units at an average density of 446.5 per square mile (171.3/km2). The racial makeup of the city was 74.94% White, 0.25% African American, 1.50% Native American, 0.12% Asian, 16.83% from other races, and 6.36% from two or more races. Hispanic or Latino of any race were 28.18% of the population.

There were 254 households, out of which 49.6% had children under the age of 18 living with them, 59.8% were married couples living together, 13.8% had a female householder with no husband present, and 21.7% were non-families. 17.7% of all households were made up of individuals, and 7.1% had someone living alone who was 65 years of age or older. The average household size was 3.16 and the average family size was 3.59.

In the city, the population was spread out, with 38.3% under the age of 18, 7.4% from 18 to 24, 30.4% from 25 to 44, 12.8% from 45 to 64, and 11.1% who were 65 years of age or older. The median age was 28 years. For every 100 females, there were 101.5 males. For every 100 females age 18 and over, there were 94.1 males.

The median income for a household in the city was $31,667, and the median income for a family was $34,063. Males had a median income of $30,278 versus $19,583 for females. The per capita income for the city was $11,865. About 16.1% of families and 18.4% of the population were below the poverty line, including 24.0% of those under age 18 and 7.1% of those age 65 or over.

Education 
Culver is served by the three-school Culver School District, including Culver High School.

Infrastructure

Transportation
Lake Billy Chinook Airport

Notable people
 Rex T. Barber (1917–2001), World War II fighter pilot credited with shooting down Japanese Admiral Yamamoto's aircraft
 Boyd R. Overhulse (1909–1966), state legislator

See also
Graham Fire

Notes and references

External links 

Entry for Culver in the Oregon Blue Book

Cities in Oregon
Cities in Jefferson County, Oregon
Populated places established in 1946
1946 establishments in Oregon